Olha Lohinova (born 3 February 1966) is a Ukrainian alpine skier. She competed in five events at the 1994 Winter Olympics.

References

External links
 

1966 births
Living people
Soviet female alpine skiers
Ukrainian female alpine skiers
Olympic alpine skiers of Ukraine
Alpine skiers at the 1994 Winter Olympics
People from Beloretsk